Mandikal is a village located in present Chikkaballapura taluk and district in Karnataka, India. It is a small village with a population of more than 1300. The main occupation is Agriculture and Animal Husbandry. Kannada and Telugu are the two main languages spoken here.  
  
This village is situated about 80 km from Bengaluru and the nearest highway is NH-44. The pincode is 562104. Mandikal is classified as a Hobli, and it has a Government School with grades from 1st standard to 10th standard. A Government ITI and PU college are also established here. 
  
Nearby villages are Gundalamandikal, Hosahalli, Bachenahalli, Yatagana halli, Nalapana halli, Jegana halli, Jidamakala halli, Yarabapana halli and Kammaguta halli.
It lies along the route to the popular trekking destination of Avulabetta hill.  

Villages in Kolar district